Francisco Carlos González Cabrera (born 20 May 1997) is a Spanish footballer who plays for Valencia CF Mestalla as a right winger.

Club career
Born in Santa Lucía de Tirajana, Las Palmas, Canary Islands, González joined UD Las Palmas' youth setup in 2015, after representing Atlético Madrid, Real Zaragoza and UD Vecindario. He made his senior debut with the reserves on 10 April 2016, starting in a 0–0 Tercera División away draw against UD Villa de Santa Brígida.

González scored his first senior goal on 21 August 2016, in a 5–0 home routing of CD Buzanada. He scored a brace in a 7–0 thrashing of SD Tenisca the following 23 April, and finished the campaign with 13 goals as his side achieved promotion.

González made his first team debut on 2 June 2019, coming on as a second-half substitute for Cristian Cedrés in a 0–0 home draw against UD Almería in the Segunda División championship. On 2 July, he agreed to a two-year deal with Valencia CF, being assigned to the B-team in Segunda División B.

References

External links
 
 
 

1997 births
Living people
People from Gran Canaria
Sportspeople from the Province of Las Palmas
Spanish footballers
Footballers from the Canary Islands
Association football wingers
Segunda División players
Segunda División B players
Tercera División players
UD Las Palmas Atlético players
UD Las Palmas players
Valencia CF Mestalla footballers